Milorad Drašković (10 April 1873 – 21 July 1921) was a Serbian politician who was the Minister of Internal Affairs of the Kingdom of Serbs, Croats and Slovenes.

Death
On 21 July 1921 Alija Alijagić, a member of the communist organization Crvena Pravda, shot and killed Drašković. Although Drašković was a staunch anti-communist and enacted several pieces of anti-communist legislation, the Communist Party of Yugoslavia condemned the act. Nevertheless, this inspired King Alexander to make a law concerning protection of the state that made the communist party illegal.

Personal life
He had four children: Radoje, Bojana, Slobodan, and Milorad.

His son Slobodan was sent to a Nazi concentration camp in the Second World War and later emigrated to the United States. There he became a member of the Serbian National Defense Council as well as the John Birch Society but later left due to being disillusioned with its pacifism.

Notes

References

1873 births
1921 deaths
People from Gornji Milanovac
Finance ministers of Yugoslavia
Government ministers of Yugoslavia
Serbian anti-communists
Yugoslav anti-communists
University of Belgrade Faculty of Law alumni
Serbian politicians
Assassinated Serbian politicians
People murdered in Croatia
Deaths by firearm in Croatia
Burials at Belgrade New Cemetery
Construction ministers of Serbia
1921 murders in Europe